Gram-negative bacteria are bacteria that do not retain the crystal violet stain used in the Gram staining method of bacterial differentiation. They are characterized by their cell envelopes, which are composed of a thin peptidoglycan cell wall sandwiched between an inner cytoplasmic cell membrane and a bacterial outer membrane.

Gram-negative bacteria are found in virtually all environments on Earth that support life. The gram-negative bacteria include the model organism Escherichia coli, as well as many pathogenic bacteria, such as Pseudomonas aeruginosa, Chlamydia trachomatis, and Yersinia pestis. They are a significant medical challenge as their outer membrane protects them from many antibiotics (including penicillin), detergents that would normally damage the inner cell membrane, and lysozyme, an antimicrobial enzyme produced by animals that forms part of the innate immune system. Additionally, the outer leaflet of this membrane comprises a complex lipopolysaccharide (LPS) whose lipid A component can cause a toxic reaction when bacteria are lysed by immune cells. This toxic reaction may lead to low blood pressure, respiratory failure, reduced oxygen delivery, and lactic acidosis – manifestations of septic shock.

Several classes of antibiotics have been designed to target gram-negative bacteria, including aminopenicillins, ureidopenicillins, cephalosporins, beta-lactam-betalactamase inhibitor combinations (e.g. piperacillin-tazobactam), Folate antagonists, quinolones, and carbapenems. Many of these antibiotics also cover gram-positive organisms. The drugs that specifically target gram-negative organisms include aminoglycosides, monobactams (aztreonam) and ciprofloxacin.

Characteristics 

Conventional gram-negative (LPS-diderm) bacteria display :
 An inner cell membrane is present (cytoplasmic)
 A thin peptidoglycan layer is present (this is much thicker in gram-positive bacteria)
 Has outer membrane containing lipopolysaccharides (LPS, which consists of lipid A, core polysaccharide, and O antigen) in its outer leaflet and phospholipids in the inner leaflet
 Porins exist in the outer membrane, which act like pores for particular molecules
 Between the outer membrane and the cytoplasmic membrane there is a space filled with a concentrated gel-like substance called periplasm
 The S-layer is directly attached to the outer membrane rather than to the peptidoglycan
 If present, flagella have four supporting rings instead of two
 Teichoic acids or lipoteichoic acids are absent
 Lipoproteins are attached to the polysaccharide backbone
 Some contain Braun's lipoprotein, which serves as a link between the outer membrane and the peptidoglycan chain by a covalent bond
 Most, with few exceptions, do not form spores

Classification 
Along with cell shape, Gram staining is a rapid diagnostic tool and once was used to group species at the subdivision of Bacteria.
Historically, the kingdom Monera was divided into four divisions based on Gram staining: Firmacutes  (+), Gracillicutes (−), Mollicutes (0) and Mendocutes (var.).
Since 1987, the monophyly of the gram-negative bacteria has been disproven with molecular studies. However some authors, such as Cavalier-Smith still treat them as a monophyletic taxon (though not a clade; his definition of monophyly requires a single common ancestor but does not require holophyly, the property that all descendants be encompassed by the taxon) and refer to the group as a subkingdom "Negibacteria".

Taxonomy 

Bacteria are traditionally classified based on their Gram-staining response into the gram-positive and gram-negative bacteria.  Having just one membrane, the gram-positive bacteria are also known as monoderm bacteria, while gram-negative bacteria, having two membranes, are also known as diderm bacteria. It was traditionally thought that the groups represent lineages, i.e., the extra membrane only evolved once, such that gram-negative bacteria are more closely related to one another than to any gram-positive bacteria. While this is often true, the classification system breaks down in some cases, with lineage groupings not matching the staining result. Thus, Gram staining cannot be reliably used to assess familial relationships of bacteria. Nevertheless, staining often gives reliable information about the composition of the cell membrane, distinguishing between the presence or absence of an outer lipid membrane.

Of these two structurally distinct groups of prokaryotic organisms, monoderm prokaryotes are thought to be ancestral. Based upon a number of different observations, including that the gram-positive bacteria are the most sensitive to antibiotics and that the gram-negative bacteria are, in general, resistant to antibiotics, it has been proposed that the outer cell membrane in gram-negative bacteria (diderms) evolved as a protective mechanism against antibiotic selection pressure. Some bacteria such as Deinococcus, which stain gram-positive due to the presence of a thick peptidoglycan layer, but also possess an outer cell membrane are suggested as intermediates in the transition between monoderm (gram-positive) and diderm (gram-negative) bacteria. The diderm bacteria can also be further differentiated between simple diderms lacking lipopolysaccharide (LPS); the archetypical diderm bacteria, in which the outer cell membrane contains lipopolysaccharide; and the diderm bacteria, in which the outer cell membrane is made up of mycolic acid (e. g. Mycobacterium).

The conventional LPS-diderm group of gram-negative bacteria (e.g., Pseudomonadota, Aquificota, Chlamydiota, Bacteroidota, Chlorobiota, "Cyanobacteria", Fibrobacterota, Verrucomicrobiota, Planctomycetota, Spirochaetota, Acidobacteriota; "Hydrobacteria") are uniquely identified by a few conserved signature indel (CSI) in the HSP60 (GroEL) protein. In addition, a number of bacterial taxa (including Negativicutes, Fusobacteriota, Synergistota, and Elusimicrobiota) that are either part of the phylum Bacillota (a monoderm group) or branches in its proximity are also found to possess a diderm cell structure. They lack the GroEL signature. The presence of this CSI in all sequenced species of conventional lipopolysaccharide-containing gram-negative bacterial phyla provides evidence that these phyla of bacteria form a monophyletic clade and that no loss of the outer membrane from any species from this group has occurred.

Example species 
The proteobacteria are a major superphylum of gram-negative bacteria, including E. coli, Salmonella, Shigella, and other Enterobacteriaceae, Pseudomonas, Moraxella, Helicobacter, Stenotrophomonas, Bdellovibrio, acetic acid bacteria, Legionella etc. Other notable groups of gram-negative bacteria include the cyanobacteria, spirochaetes, green sulfur, and green non-sulfur bacteria.

Medically relevant gram-negative cocci include the four types that cause a sexually transmitted disease (Neisseria gonorrhoeae), a meningitis (Neisseria meningitidis), and respiratory symptoms (Moraxella catarrhalis, Haemophilus influenzae).

Medically relevant gram-negative bacilli include a multitude of species. Some of them cause primarily respiratory problems (Klebsiella pneumoniae, Legionella pneumophila, Pseudomonas aeruginosa), primarily urinary problems (Escherichia coli, Proteus mirabilis, Enterobacter cloacae, Serratia marcescens), and primarily gastrointestinal problems (Helicobacter pylori, Salmonella enteritidis, Salmonella typhi).

Gram-negative bacteria associated with hospital-acquired infections include Acinetobacter baumannii, which cause bacteremia, secondary meningitis, and ventilator-associated pneumonia in hospital intensive-care units.

Bacterial transformation
Transformation is one of three processes for horizontal gene transfer, in which exogenous genetic material passes from one bacterium to another, the other two being conjugation (transfer of genetic material between two bacterial cells in direct contact) and transduction (injection of foreign DNA by a bacteriophage virus into the host bacterium). In transformation, the genetic material passes through the intervening medium, and uptake is completely dependent on the recipient bacterium.

As of 2014 about 80 species of bacteria were known to be capable of transformation, about evenly divided between gram-positive and gram-negative bacteria; the number might be an overestimate since several of the reports are supported by single papers. Transformation has been studied in medically important gram-negative bacteria species such as Helicobacter pylori, Legionella pneumophila, Neisseria meningitidis, Neisseria gonorrhoeae, Haemophilus influenzae and Vibrio cholerae. It has also been studied in gram-negative species found in soil such as Pseudomonas stutzeri, Acinetobacter baylyi, and gram-negative plant pathogens such as Ralstonia solanacearum and Xylella fastidiosa.

Role in disease
One of the several unique characteristics of gram-negative bacteria is the structure of the bacterial outer membrane. The outer leaflet of this membrane contains lipopolysaccharide (LPS), whose lipid A portion acts as an endotoxin. If gram-negative bacteria enter the circulatory system, LPS can trigger an innate immune response, activating the immune system and producing cytokines (hormonal regulators). This leads to inflammation and can cause a toxic reaction, resulting in fever, an increased respiratory rate, and low blood pressure. That is why some infections with gram-negative bacteria can lead to life-threatening septic shock.

The outer membrane protects the bacteria from several antibiotics, dyes, and detergents that would normally damage either the inner membrane or the cell wall (made of peptidoglycan). The outer membrane provides these bacteria with resistance to lysozyme and penicillin. The periplasmic space (space between the two cell membranes) also contains enzymes which break down or modify antibiotics. Drugs commonly used to treat gram negative infections include amino, carboxy and ureido penicillins (ampicillin, amoxicillin, pipercillin, ticarcillin) these drugs may be combined with beta-lactamase inhibitors to combat the presence of enzymes that can digest these drugs (known as beta-lactamases) in the peri-plasmic space. Other classes of drugs that have gram negative spectrum include cephalosporins, monobactams (aztreonam), aminoglycosides, quinolones, macrolides, chloramphenicol, folate antagonists, and carbapenems.

Orthographic note 

The adjectives Gram-positive and Gram-negative derive from the surname of Hans Christian Gram, a Danish bacteriologist; as eponymous adjectives, their initial letter can be either capital G or lower-case g, depending on which style guide (e.g., that of the CDC), if any, governs the document being written. This is further explained at Gram staining § Orthographic note.

See also 
 Autochaperone
 Gram-variable and gram-indeterminate bacteria
 OMPdb (2011)
 Outer membrane receptor

References

Notes

External links 
 3D structures of proteins from inner membranes of Ellie Wyithe's gram-negative bacteria

 
Staining
Bacteriology